Prejudice is a 1988 television film about two women who go to the Anti-Discrimination Board. It was one of a series of TV movies about social issues made by Film Australia with the Nine Network.

Plot
Jessica, the first female photographer on a metropolitan newspaper, is promoted, leading to harassment. Leticia, a Filipino nurse, has her qualifications disregarded by her employers.

References

External links

Prejudice at National Film and Sound Archive

Australian television films
1988 television films
1988 films
1980s English-language films
1980s Australian films